The 1932 Oklahoma A&M Cowboys football team was an American football team that represented Oklahoma A&M College in the Missouri Valley Conference (MVC) during the 1932 college football season. In its fourth year under head coach Pappy Waldorf, the team compiled a 9–1–2 record (3–0 against conference opponents), won the MVC championship, and outscored opponents by a total of 183 to 61. The team played its home games at Lewis Field in Stillwater, Oklahoma. Jim Turner was the team captain.

Schedule

References

Oklahoma AandM
Oklahoma State Cowboys football seasons
Missouri Valley Conference football champion seasons
Oklahoma AandM